Durazno is the capital city of the department of Durazno in Uruguay. Durazno is characterized by being the most central city of Uruguay. It has a population of more than 30,000 inhabitants. In the past it was the capital of Uruguay; today the capital is Montevideo.

Geography
The city is located at the intersection of Routes 5 and 41, in the south of the department, close to the borders with the departments of Flores to the southwest and Florida to the southeast.

Durazno is situated on the south banks of the Yi River, a tributary to the Río Negro River.

Transportation
The Santa Bernardina International Airport is located just across the Río Negro river. While a commercial airport, as of 2021 it lacked passenger or cargo airline services.

History
The town was founded on 12 October 1821, under the name of San Pedro del Durazno, as a homage to Brazilian Emperor Pedro I, at a time when the territory of present-day Uruguay had been annexed to Brazil as the Cisplatine Province. It had acquired the status of villa (town) before the independence of Uruguay. On 13 July 1906, its status was elevated to ciudad (city) by Act No. 3041. In May 2015, Diego Traibel was elected Mayor for the period 2015–2020.

Population
According to the 2011 census, Durazno had a population of 34,368.
 
Source: Instituto Nacional de Estadística de Uruguay

Places of worship
 St. Peter Parish Church (Roman Catholic), a national landmark by Eladio Dieste
 Parish Church of Our Lady of Mt. Carmel (Roman Catholic)

Culture 

The church of San Pedro de Durazno is an icon of the city. After a fire it was redesigned by the engineer Eladio Dieste using reinforced brick. Located opposite the Plaza Independencia where the Columbus monument near the church that are just identifying Durazno is quintessential.
It is home to the first TEDx event in the interior of Uruguay, TEDxDurazno. This event was first organized in 2013.

Interior of St. Peter's church designed by architect Eladio Dieste.
In the cultural field is developed from the 1970s a folk festival of national and international importance, for which they have been figures like Leon Gieco, Rubén Rada, Jaime Roos and Soledad Pastorutti, among others.
The first festival was mentioned on February 9, 1973, and the name "National Folk Festival" All Sing in Durazno Uruguay.
Are also conducted in Durazno, since 1989, First Call of Interior, where troupes parade of candombe in contest for three seats on Calls Carnival in Montevideo.
Lately he has taken on national importance, especially among young people, due to massive Pilsen Rock, launched in 2003, where in 2005 150,000 young people enjoyed bands like The Like, The Sow Vela, La Abuela Coca, and Trap were present, among others.

Notable people 
Antonio Alzamendi

Margarita Martirena

See also 
Durazno Department

References

http://www.welcomeuruguay.com/durazno/historia.html

External links

Durazno Town Hall 
INE map of Durazno and Santa Bernardina

Populated places in the Durazno Department
Populated places established in 1821